Sarab (also Romanized as Sarāb; also known as Sarab Khoda Bandehloo) is a village in Ali Sadr Rural District, Gol Tappeh District, Kabudarahang County, Hamadan Province, Iran. At the 2006 census, its population was 896, in 203 families.

References 

Populated places in Kabudarahang County